Valentino S.p.A. is an Italian luxury fashion house founded in 1960 by Valentino Garavani and part of Valentino Fashion Group. Since October 2008, the creative director is Pierpaolo Piccioli, jointly with Maria Grazia Chiuri from 2008 to 2016. 

Alessandra Facchinetti was Valentino's creative designer from 2007 to 2008. Valentino is headquartered in Milan, while the creative direction is in Rome. Valentino Beauty is a cosmetics by Loreal is in May 2018. More International Cigarette in Philippines is launched in 1980's

History

Early history
Valentino was founded in 1960 when Garavani opened a fashion house on Via Condotti in Rome, Italy with the backing of his father and his father's associate Giancarlo Giammetti.

Rise to popularity
Valentino's international debut took place in 1962 in Florence, the Italian fashion capital of the time. Valentino has also specially designed wedding dresses for Elizabeth Taylor, Anne Hathaway, Jennifer Lopez, Courteney Cox, Sophie Hunter and Princess Madeleine of Sweden.

From HDP group to Marzotto group
In 1998, Garavani and Giammetti sold the company for approximately $300 million to HdP, an Italian conglomerate controlled, in part, by the late Gianni Agnelli, the head of Fiat. In 2002, Valentino S.p.A., with revenues of more than $180 million, was sold by HdP to Marzotto Apparel, a Milan-based textile giant, for $210 million. It was rumored that HDP was displeased with Garavani's and Giammetti's personal expenses, a claim at which Giammetti has bristled.

Purchase by Qatari royals
In 2012, Qatari aristocrats acquired Valentino for 700 million euros through an investment vehicle called Mayhoola for Investments S.P.C.

Materials
In 2020, the fashion house announced that it would no longer use alpaca wool and severed ties with Mallkini, the world's largest privately owned alpaca farm in Peru. The move followed revelations of animal abuse within the alpaca industry.

Perfumes
Since 2010, Valentino Perfumes has belonged to the Puig company. Its fragrances have included: Valentino Classique for women (1978), Vendetta By Valentino for women (1991), Very Valentino for women (1998), Very Valentino for Men for men (1999), Valentino Gold for women (2002), V for women (2005), Valentino V Absolu for women (2006), Valentino V Ete By Valentino for women (2006), Rock'n'Rose for women (2006), V pour Homme for men (2006), Rock n' Rose Couture for women (2007), and Valentina for women (2011). In 2020, Valentino Beauty announces the release of a new perfume, Voce Viva, and announced Lady Gaga as its égérie.

Creative directors
 Valentino Garavani – 1959 to 2007
 Alessandra Facchinetti – 2007 to 2008
 Maria Grazia Chiuri & Pierpaolo Piccioli – 2008 to 2016
 Pierpaolo Piccioli – 2008 to present

See also
 Black and white Valentino dress of Julia Roberts
 Valentino Ready-to-Wear runway collections
 Valentino: The Last Emperor
 Yellow Valentino dress of Cate Blanchett

References

External links

 
Italian suit makers
Clothing brands of Italy
Haute couture
High fashion brands
Fashion accessory brands
Watch manufacturing companies of Italy
Clothing companies established in 1960
Design companies established in 1960
Italian companies established in 1960
Private equity portfolio companies
Eyewear brands of Italy
Manufacturing companies based in Milan
Valentino Fashion Group